The Nightcomers is a 1971 British horror film directed by Michael Winner and starring Marlon Brando, Stephanie Beacham, Thora Hird, Harry Andrews and Anna Palk. It is a prequel to Henry James' 1898 novella The Turn of the Screw, which had already been adapted into the 1961 film The Innocents. The manor house in the film is Sawston Hall, a 16th-century Tudor manor house in Sawston, Cambridgeshire.

Plot
Recently orphaned, Flora and Miles are abandoned by their new guardian (Harry Andrews) and entrusted to the care of housekeeper Mrs. Grose (Thora Hird), governess Miss Jessel (Stephanie Beacham), and Peter Quint (Brando), the former valet and now gardener. With only these three adults for company, the children live an isolated life in the sprawling country manor estate. The children are particularly fascinated by Peter Quint due to his eclectic knowledge and engaging stories, and willingness to entertain them. With this captive audience, Quint doses out his strange philosophies on love and death. The governess, Miss Jessel, also falls under Peter's spell, and despite her repulsion the two embark on a sadomasochistic love affair. Flora and Miles become fascinated with this relationship, and help Quint and Jessel to escape the interference of disapproving Mrs. Grose.

The children begin spying on Quint and Jessel's violent trysts and mimic what they see, including the bondage, culminating in Miles nearly pushing Flora off a building to her death. Mrs. Grose determines to write to the absent master of the house in order to get both Quint and Jessel sacked. The children are most distressed by this, and decide to take matters into their own hands to prevent the separation. Acting on Quint's assertions that love is hate and it is only in death that people can truly be united, the children murder Miss Jessel by knocking a hole in the boat she uses to wait for Quint (who never keeps the appointments), knowing that she cannot swim. Quint later finds Miss Jessel's rigid body in the water, but is given little time to mourn before Miles kills him with a bow and arrow. The film ends with the arrival of a new governess, presumably the one who features in The Turn of the Screw.

Cast
 Marlon Brando as Peter Quint
 Stephanie Beacham as Miss Jessel
 Thora Hird as Mrs. Grose
 Harry Andrews as Master of the House
 Verna Harvey as Flora
 Christopher Ellis as Miles
 Anna Palk as New Governess

Differences from the book
The children in the film are portrayed as being a few years older than in the Henry James novel. Reviewer Brian Holcomb sees the reason for this in the sexual nature of the film and their roles in it (Verna Harvey was in fact 19 at the time).

Production
The film was based on an original script by Michael Hastings. He started with the beginning of the Turn of the Screw and plotted backwards. He says he wanted the two lead characters to be "plausible... based on their strange eroticism."

Brando's casting was announced in November 1970. Filming took place in February and March 1971.

Release
The film opened at the 32nd Venice International Film Festival on 30 August 1971.

Reception

Critical
The film has received mixed reviews. Brando's performance earned him a nomination for a BAFTA award for Best Actor, but recent audiences have criticised his cartoonish Irish accent. The film has a 57% critics' rating at Rotten Tomatoes.

Some reviewers have objected to the film's premise of showing what happened before the novel, as this threatens the ambiguity the novel explores. Tom Milne took a very negative view of The Nightcomers, describing it as "a film crass enough to have the outraged ghost of Henry James haunting Wardour Street". Milne also criticised Hastings' script, stating his dialogue "sounds embarrassingly like a Cockney nanny doing her best to be genteel". Leonard Maltin blamed Winner's "poor direction" for hurting the film's attempt to chronicle the original story's preceding events.

Box office
The film was a commercial disappointment at the box office. However Michael Winner claimed the film made its money back, adding "it was only the sex and violence that made it profitable. It was rather an intellectual piece, but without the violence it would have gone nowhere at all."

References

External links
 
 

1971 horror films
1970s English-language films
Films directed by Michael Winner
Films scored by Jerry Fielding
Embassy Pictures films
Films set in 1897
Films set in country houses
Films shot in Cambridgeshire
Films based on The Turn of the Screw
Films produced by Michael Winner